Nagovisi, or Sibe, is a South Bougainville language spoken in the mountains of southern Bougainville Province, Papua New Guinea.

Morphology
Nagovisi makes use of noun class suffixes, which are:

External links 
 Paradisec has Open Access collections that include Nagovisi materials, including the Arthur Cappell collections (AC1, AC2).

References

Languages of the Autonomous Region of Bougainville
South Bougainville languages